Kaistia adipata is a bacterium from the genus of Kaistia which has been isolated from soil near the Chung-Ju industrial complex in Korea.

References

Further reading

External links
Type strain of Kaistia adipata at BacDive -  the Bacterial Diversity Metadatabase	

Hyphomicrobiales
Bacteria described in 2005